Mohamad Faouzi Haidar (born 8 November 1989) is a Lebanese professional footballer who plays as a winger or attacking midfielder for  club Ahed and the Lebanon national team.

Coming through the youth system, Haidar began his senior career in 2008 at hometown club Tadamon Sour, before moving to Safa in 2011. After two seasons Haidar moved abroad, first to Al-Ittihad and Al-Fateh in Saudi Arabia, then to Amanat Baghdad in Iraq. He returned to Safa in 2015, before joining Ahed the following season.

Haidar represented Lebanon internationally since 2011, playing in the 2019 AFC Asian Cup, Lebanon's first participation through qualification. He also played in the 2014, 2018, and 2022 FIFA World Cup qualifiers, and 2015 and 2019 AFC Asian Cup qualifiers.

Club career

Tadamon Sour 
Having joined their youth system in 2003, Haidar began his senior career for hometown club Tadamon Sour in 2008 in the Lebanese Premier League.

Safa

2011–2013: First two seasons 
In summer 2011, Haidar joined fellow-Lebanese Premier League side Safa in a deal worth USD$105,000. He became a key player for the team, helping them win two consecutive league titles in 2011–12 and 2012–13. Haidar also won the Lebanese Golden Ball in 2013.

2013–2014: Loans abroad 
In summer 2013, he moved to Saudi Arabia to play for Al-Ittihad on loan. He made his debut on 13 September 2013, helping his team defeat the league title holders Al-Fateh. In January 2014, Haidar moved to Al-Fateh on a six-month loan. In summer 2014, Haidar moved to Iraqi Premier League side Amanat Baghdad on a one-year loan.

2015–2016: Return to Safa 
In summer 2015, Haidar returned to Lebanon to play for Safa, and won the Lebanese Premier League 2015–16.

Ahed 
In summer 2016, Haidar moved to Ahed on a five-year deal worth $670,000. He became the second-most expensive Lebanese player in history, after Pierre Issa's transfer to Olympic Beirut in 2002 for $1 million. On 8 September 2020, Haidar renewed his contract with Ahed for six years.

International career

Haidar represented Lebanon at under-19 and under-23 levels.

He made his senior debut for Lebanon on 17 August 2011, in a friendly against Syria. Haidar's first international goal came on 16 October 2012, in a friendly against Yemen; he helped his side win 2–1. In 2013, he scored twice in the 2015 AFC Asian Cup qualification, against Thailand and Iran respectively.

In December 2018, Haidar was called up for the 2019 AFC Asian Cup squad. He played in all three group stage games, against Qatar, Saudi Arabia, and North Korea.

Style of play 
Initially starting out as a winger, Haidar moved to a more central role further on in his career. He is known for his dribbling and close control of the ball, as well as his set-pieces.

Career statistics

International 

Scores and results list Lebanon's goal tally first, score column indicates score after each Haidar goal.

Honours 
Safa
 Lebanese Premier League: 2011–12, 2012–13, 2015–16
 Lebanese FA Cup: 2012–13
 Lebanese Elite Cup: 2012

Ahed
 AFC Cup: 2019
 Lebanese Premier League: 2016–17, 2017–18, 2018–19, 2021–22
 Lebanese FA Cup: 2017–18, 2018–19
 Lebanese Elite Cup: 2022; runner-up: 2021
 Lebanese Super Cup: 2017, 2018, 2019

Individual
 Lebanese Premier League Best Player: 2012–13, 2015–16
 Lebanese Premier League Team of the Season: 2011–12, 2012–13, 2015–16, 2017–18
 Lebanese Premier League top scorer: 2011–12
 Lebanese Premier League top assist provider: 2015–16

See also
 List of Lebanon international footballers

References

External links 

 
 Mohamad Haidar at RSSSF
 
 
 
 

1989 births
Living people
People from Tyre District
Lebanese footballers
Association football forwards
Association football wingers
Association football midfielders
Tadamon Sour SC players
Safa SC players
Ittihad FC players
Al-Fateh SC players
Amanat Baghdad players
Al Ahed FC players
Lebanese Premier League players
Saudi Professional League players
Iraqi Premier League players
Lebanese expatriate footballers
Lebanese expatriate sportspeople in Saudi Arabia
Lebanese expatriate sportspeople in Iraq
Expatriate footballers in Saudi Arabia
Expatriate footballers in Iraq
Lebanon youth international footballers
Lebanon international footballers
2019 AFC Asian Cup players
Lebanese Premier League top scorers
AFC Cup winning players